Dattykh (Dättaghe Даьттагӏа, Dättagha) is a rural locality (a selo) in Sunzhensky District of the Republic of Ingushetia, Russia, located on the left bank of the river Fortanga. It forms the municipality of the rural settlement of Dattykh as the only settlement in its composition.

Geography 
The village is located on the left bank of the Fortanga river.

The nearest settlements: the village of Muzhichi in the west (less than 9 km in a straight line), the village of Galashki in the north-west (nearest by road).

History 
Dattykh was founded in 1801 and is the ancestral village of the Bulguchevs and Korigovs (Upper Dattykh) and the Gandaloevs and Belkharoevs (Lower Dattykh). On the territory of the settlement, the remains of battle towers of representatives of these surnames have been preserved.

A well-known source of salt mining - Dattykh, located on the ground
lyakh of the Karabulak society, served in the medieval period as the basis
welfare of the Belkharoev family. In a later period, evaporated
salt from this source was used by all
Kists, all Ingush, all Karabulaks and part of Chechens.

In January 6th of 1851, in order to punish the highlanders for their insolence,  gathered a detachment and moved the main mass of cavalry under the command of Lieutenant Colonel Mezentsev to the village of Dattykh, which has long been known as the nest of the most courageous robbers, and he himself, with infantry and part of the Cossacks, went to the village of Gandal-Bas in the same gorge. The blow inflicted by Lieutenant Colonel Mezentsov on the village of Verkhne-Datykhsky forced all other villages in the Fortanga gorge, not excluding Gandal-Bas, to bow to obedience, which prevented the severe punishment that awaited them from the Sleptsov detachment. Having finished this business so successfully and without any loss, the flying detachment, after a short rest on the line, continued to cut down forests.

Beginning in 1859, the Orstkhoys began to be evicted from all their mountain villages, including Dattykh. At the same time, on the site of the settlement, a Cossack village - Datykhskaya was founded.

In 1863, according to family lists, 33 families lived in Dattykh.

In 1865, all Karabulaks were evicted from the village, and among the Muhajirs left for the Ottoman Empire.

In 1875, with the permission of the military authorities, Dattykh began to be populated by the mountaineers from the Khamkhin and Tsorin societies, who rented the royal state land.

From 1944 to 1958, during the period of the deportation of Chechens and Ingush and the abolition of the Chechen-Ingush ASSR, the village was called Klyuchevoye. After the restoration of the Chechen-Ingush ASSRin 1958, the village was returned to its historical name - Dattykh.

References

Bibliography 
 
 
 
 
 

Rural localities in Ingushetia